Léo Lacroix (born 27 February 1992) is a Swiss professional footballer who plays as a defender for A-League Men club Western United. He played one match for the Switzerland national team in 2018.

Club career
On 31 August 2016, Ligue 1 side Saint-Étienne announced that they had reached an agreement for the transfer of Lacroix. Lacroix signed a four year contract and in his first season he had 20 appearances in the 2016–17 Ligue 1. In the 2017–18 Ligue 1 season he played 11 games for the team, but was then loaned out to Swiss club Basel.

Lacroix joined Basel's first team in the winter break of their 2017–18 season under head coach Raphaël Wicky. The loan was dated until summer 2018, with the option of a definite transfer. Basel had to find a replacement for Manuel Akanji, who had transferred out to Borussia Dortmund. Lacroix played his domestic league debut for the club in the away game in the Stockhorn Arena on 10 February as Basel won 2–0 against Thun. Lacroix stayed with Basel until the end of the season, but the club did not pull the option. During his short period with the club Lacroix played a total of 12 games for Basel without scoring a goal. Nine of these games were in the Swiss Super League, one in the Swiss Cup and two games against Manchester City in the 2017–18 UEFA Champions League knockout phase. 

In September 2021, Lacroix signed with Australian club Western United.

International career
Lacroix was born in Switzerland, and is of Brazilian descent through his mother. He got his first call up to the senior Switzerland side for the 2018 FIFA World Cup qualifiers against Hungary and Andorra in October 2016. He made his debut for the national team on 14 November 2018 in a friendly against Qatar.

Career statistics

Club

Honours
Sion
Swiss Cup: 2014–15

Western United
A-League Men: 2021–22

Individual
A-Leagues All Star: 2022
 PFA A-League Team of the Season: 2021–22

References

External links
 
 

1992 births
Living people
Sportspeople from Lausanne
Swiss people of Brazilian descent
Association football defenders
Swiss men's footballers
Switzerland under-21 international footballers
Switzerland international footballers
Swiss Super League players
Ligue 1 players
2. Bundesliga players
A-League Men players
FC Sion players
AS Saint-Étienne players
FC Basel players
Hamburger SV players
Western United FC players
Swiss expatriate footballers
Swiss expatriate sportspeople in France
Expatriate footballers in France
Swiss expatriate sportspeople in Germany
Expatriate footballers in Germany
Expatriate soccer players in Australia
Swiss expatriate sportspeople in Australia